Bird Conservation Nepal (Nepali: नेपाल पंक्षी संरक्षण सङ्घ) (BCN), also known as BirdLife Nepal, is a non-profit organisation founded in Nepal focusing on the conservation of birds. It was founded in 1982 in presidentship of Late Harisaran Kazi. It has a membership of 912 people. It is a partner organizations of BirdLife International.

See also
 BirdLife International
 List of birds of Nepal

References

External links
 
 Bird Conservation Nepal on The Himalayan Times

BirdLife Nepal
Ornithological organizations
Organizations established in 1982
Bird conservation organizations
1982 establishments in Nepal